Fullerton is a city located in northern Orange County, California, United States. As of the 2020 census, the city had a total population of 143,617.

Fullerton was founded in 1887. It secured the land on behalf of the Atchison, Topeka and Santa Fe Railway. Historically it was a center of agriculture, notably groves of Valencia oranges and other citrus crops; petroleum extraction; transportation; and manufacturing. It is home to numerous higher educational institutions, particularly California State University, Fullerton and Fullerton College. From the mid-1940s through the late 1990s, Fullerton was home to a large industrial base made up of aerospace contractors, canneries, paper products manufacturers, and is considered to be the birthplace of the electric guitar, due in large part to Leo Fender. The headquarters of Vons, which is owned by Albertsons, is located in Fullerton near the Fullerton–Anaheim line.

History

Indigenous
Evidence of prehistoric animal habitation, such as saber-toothed cats and mammoths, is present in Ralph B. Clark Regional Park in the northwest of the city. 

The area of the city was a part of the homelands of the Tongva for thousands of years. There was a large village in the area along the Santa Ana River that has since been identified as the Hutuknga. The village was one of the largest throughout all of Tovaangar, or the Tongva world. It was connected by marriage ties to other villages in the area, including Genga. Acorns and seeds from grasses and sages were regularly cultivated. Trade connections were established with villages on the coast and those further inland.

Spanish era 
Europeans first passed through the area in 1769 when Gaspar de Portolà led a Spanish expedition north to Monterey. From the description recorded in the diary of Father Juan Crespi, it seems likely that the party camped on July 29 near present-day Laguna Lake, in the Sunny Hills area.

In 1837, the Fullerton area became part of Rancho San Juan Cajón de Santa Ana, granted to Juan Pacifico Ontiveros, a Spanish soldier.

American era 
Ontiveros began selling parcels of the Rancho to migrant Americans settling and developing California in the aftermath of the 1849 Gold Rush, including Abel Stearns. In the 1860s, Stearns sold in turn to Domingo Bastanchury, a Basque shepherd.

In 1886, while in the area on a duck hunting vacation, brothers George and Edward Amerige, heard rumors that the California Central Railroad, a subsidiary of the Santa Fe Railway, was looking for land. They then began negotiations with George H. Fullerton, president of the Pacific Land and Improvement Company, also a Santa Fe subsidiary. They offered free right-of-way and half interest in the land to the railroad if Fullerton's survey were revised to include the proposed town site, and on July 5, 1887, Edward Amerige formally staked his claim at what is now the intersection of Harbor Boulevard and Commonwealth Avenue.

In 1894, Charles Chapman purchased an orange orchard in eastern Fullerton. The Valencia variety of oranges he promoted from his Santa Ysabel Ranch, well suited to the local climate, proved a boon to producers; Fullerton boasted more orange groves than any other municipality in the United States. Cultivation of walnuts and avocados also flourished, and the Western railroad town became an agricultural center. Fullerton was incorporated in 1904, but not officially recognized until 1907, due to conflicts at that time.

Boom years

Drilling for petroleum began in 1880 with the discovery of the Brea-Olinda Oil Field and fueled the first real boom, peaking in the 1920s. Construction reflected the vogue for Spanish Colonial and Italian Renaissance-inspired architecture, as in the historic Fox Fullerton Theatre (erected 1925); the Muckenthaler House, designed by Frank K. Benchley (erected 1924); and the city's chief landmark, the Plummer Auditorium and clock tower (erected 1930). Fullerton College was established at its present location at Chapman Avenue and Lemon Street in 1913. Meanwhile, the city banned all overnight street parking in 1924 – a law enforced to the present day, unless an area is specifically exempted.

Significant public works projects from the interwar period were constructed during this period, including the conversion of a southwestern sewer farm into Fullerton Municipal Airport at the behest of Placentia ranchers and aviators William and Robert Dowling in 1927. Through the mid-1900s, the economy shifted toward food processing rather than food production, as well as manufacturing; southeastern Fullerton became an industrial center. Val Vita Food Products began operating a citrus juice plant in western Fullerton in 1932. By 1941, it had become the largest food processing company in the US. In 1934, A.W. Leo, Tom Yates and Ralph Harrison developed the first Hawaiian Punch recipe in a converted garage in Fullerton. The city also became a producer of aerospace equipment, electrical and electronic components, navigation systems, and laboratory instruments.

In 1943, the Alex Bernal residence became the site of one of the first successful lawsuits against household covenant laws in the country after Alex and Esther Bernal purchased a home in a Fullerton neighborhood that barred purchases from "Mexicans." After a home invasion that resulted in their belongings being thrown into the street and a petition signed by fifty neighborhood residents to have the Bernal's removed from the neighborhood, a lawsuit was issued against the Bernals on the basis that their presence caused "irreparable injury" to the neighborhood that could lead to "coming in contact with said other races, including Mexicans, in a social and neighborhood manner." Lawyer David C. Marcus represented the Bernals in Doss vs. Bernal and won the case, which received national attention.

In 1949, Leo Fender developed and refined the world's first commercially successful solid-body electric guitar, the Fender Telecaster.

Postwar suburbanization

Although Fullerton, like other Southern California cities, had experienced an expansion of population due to housing development, this increased by an order of magnitude during the post war years. Fullerton's population soared after World War II as American veterans migrated to California, bought housing in the land development which destroyed the surrounding farming and park areas, and in particular after the construction of Interstate 5 and development in neighboring Anaheim.

To serve the growing population, the California State Legislature authorized Orange County State College in 1957, which began operating out of Fullerton high schools in 1959. In 1963, it moved to its present campus on State College Boulevard, and later, after several name-changes, was finally redesignated California State University, Fullerton. The Fullerton Arboretum, a 26-acre (105,000 m2) botanical garden, opened in 1979.

Manufacturing growth leveled off as ever-soaring property prices, increasing environmental regulation, traffic, and other pressures increased. By the late 20th century the city had lost much of its rural character in favor of suburban housing tracts and shopping centers.

Recent history
In the 1990s, the downtown commercial district had become economically depressed, and was known mainly for being an area of sleepy antique stores and small shops. A symbol of downtown's problems was the Fox Theatre, a local landmark, which had fallen into disrepair. As of November 2004, a fundraising drive had accumulated sufficient funds to buy the theater, but not yet enough money to restore it. By 2006, restoration was started.

During this same period, downtown Fullerton (DTF), especially in the south of Commonwealth area (SOCO), has become more of a busy entertainment district, described by the OC Weekly as "Bourbon Street West." In less than five years, some 30 businesses that sell alcohol have opened, making the downtown area much more active at night. In 2008, City Manager Chris Meyer called together department head and the finance department and reported to the city council that the Restaurant Overlay District (established December 2002) was costing the city $935,000 over and above the sales taxes collected.

The  Hughes Aircraft Company's Ground Systems Group campus in western Fullerton was redeveloped into a new residential and commercial district called Amerige Heights, in between 2001 and 2004.

Geography

Fullerton is located at  (33.879914, -117.928749).

It is bordered by La Habra and Brea on the north, La Mirada on the northwest, Buena Park on the west, Anaheim on the south, and Placentia on the east.

The flat downtown area is laid out in a grid plan centered at the intersection of Harbor Boulevard and Commonwealth Avenue. After recent renewal and beautification projects, it has attracted specialty stores, coffee shops, and restaurants, and has uncharacteristically retained much of its downtown character. Southeastern Fullerton is historically the industrial sector, and is home to small manufacturing, particularly east of Raymond Street and south of Commonwealth.

The northern and western reaches of Fullerton are dominated by the Coyote Hills, a low-lying mountain range divided into the East Coyote Hills and West Coyote Hills. The land south of West Coyote Hills is known as Sunny Hills. For most of the city's history these areas were groves of citrus trees, open scrubland, and oil fields. While equestrian trails and many old estates endure along Bastanchury Road, the meandering roads through these areas today mostly connect a succession of housing tract subdivisions and commercial developments. In recent years, the City Council has tried to allow development in the remaining open land throughout the city. The most notable impending project, in West Coyote Hills, has been met with opposition by many of the citizens in the area.

Development of West Coyote Hills 
 
West Coyote Hills is a ridge lying mostly in northern Fullerton, including  owned by Pacific Coast Homes (a land development division of the Chevron Corporation) that are the largest remaining tract of undeveloped land in north Orange County. The current development agreement calls for building houses on some of the land while donating the remainder to the city as a nature preserve. A group that supports keeping the entire area as open space/nature preserve qualified a referendum for a November 2012 election. In the election, voters approved Measure W, which would prevent development in the area. Ongoing lawsuits between the City of Fullerton (pro-development) and local conservationists (anti-development) have resulted over the interpretation of the measure. In February 2019, the California State Supreme Court denied a petition to review a lower court pro-development decision against Measure W. The City of Fullerton and The Friends of Coyote Hills are currently in competing negotiations with Chevron over either purchasing the land for development or donating the land for conservation with Chevron receiving tax credits and conservation funds in exchange for the donation.

Climate
According to the Köppen Climate Classification system, Fullerton has a warm-summer Mediterranean climate, abbreviated Csa on climate maps.

Parks

Fullerton maintains more than 50 city parks and is home to Hillcrest Park, Chapman Park, and the Orange County Regional parks Craig Regional Park and Ralph B. Clark Regional Park (in neighboring Buena Park, although a small portion lies within Fullerton city limits). The Fullerton Arboretum comprises  (105,000 m2) of sculpted gardens and unusual plants in northeastern Fullerton.

The Fullerton city council voted on November 15, 2019 to proceed with work on a concept plan for a memorial to Korean War veterans at Hillcrest Park. The project will be funded and developed by The Orange County Korean War Memorial Committee.

Demographics

2000

There were 43,609 households, out of which 33.0% had children under the age of 18 living with them, 51.8% were married couples living together, 11.0% had a female householder with no husband present, and 32.1% were non-families. 23.5% of all households were made up of individuals, and 7.3% had someone living alone who was 65 years of age or older. The average household size was 2.83 and the average family size was 3.37.

In the city, the population was spread out, with 25.1% under the age of 18, 11.5% from 18 to 24, 32.3% from 25 to 44, 19.8% from 45 to 64, and 11.3% who were 65 years of age or older. The median age was 33 years. For every 100 females, there were 97.7 males. For every 100 females age 18 and over, there were 96.1 males.

The median income for a household in the city was $57,345 (Orange County 2005), and the median income for a family was $75,700. Males had a median income of $40,674 versus $31,677 for females. The per capita income for the city was $23,370. About 8.0% of families and 11.4% of the population were below the poverty line, including 13.6% of those under age 18 and 5.4% of those age 65 or over.

2010

The 2010 United States Census reported that Fullerton had a population of 135,161. The racial makeup of Fullerton was 72,845 (53.9%) White, 3,138 (2.3%) African American, 842 (0.6%) Native American, 30,788 (22.8%) Asian, 321 (0.2%) Pacific Islander, 21,439 (15.9%) from other races, and 5,788 (4.3%) from two or more races. Hispanic or Latino of any race were 46,501 persons (34.4%). Non-Hispanic Whites were 38.2% of the population, down from 79.0% in 1980.

The Census reported that 132,084 people (97.7% of the population) lived in households, 2,318 (1.7%) lived in non-institutionalized group quarters, and 759 (0.6%) were institutionalized.

There were 45,391 households, out of which 16,155 (35.6%) had children under the age of 18 living in them, 23,240 (51.2%) were opposite-sex married couples living together, 5,502 (12.1%) had a female householder with no husband present, 2,505 (5.5%) had a male householder with no wife present.  There were 2,366 (5.2%) unmarried opposite-sex partnerships, and 290 (0.6%) same-sex married couples or partnerships. 9,771 households (21.5%) were made up of individuals, and 3,342 (7.4%) had someone living alone who was 65 years of age or older. The average household size was 2.91.  There were 31,247 families (68.8% of all households); the average family size was 3.43.

The population was spread out, with 31,558 people (23.3%) under the age of 18, 17,522 people (13.0%) aged 18 to 24, 37,764 people (27.9%) aged 25 to 44, 32,465 people (24.0%) aged 45 to 64, and 15,852 people (11.7%) who were 65 years of age or older.  The median age was 34.8 years. For every 100 females, there were 96.6 males.  For every 100 females age 18 and over, there were 94.4 males.

The homeowner vacancy rate was 1.1%; the rental vacancy rate was 7.0%.  73,127 people (54.1% of the population) lived in owner-occupied housing units and 58,957 people (43.6%) lived in rental housing units.

According to the 2010 United States Census, Fullerton had a median household income of $67,617, with 14.6% of the population living below the federal poverty line.

Economy

According to the city's 2020 Comprehensive Annual Financial Report, the top employers in the city are:

Government

Fullerton is a General-law municipality with a council-manager government system. Legislative authority is vested in a city council of five non-partisan members who serve four-year staggered terms, who elect a chair who serves as mayor. Elections are held every two years and are consolidated with the statewide general elections held in November of even numbered years. The city manager is responsible for day-to-day operations. Prior to 2016, all council seats were elected at large. In 2016 voters passed Measure II which changed at large representation to election for five districts.

State and federal representation

Emergency services

Fire protection and emergency medical services are provided by the Fullerton Fire Department with ambulance transport by Care Ambulance Service. Fullerton has one full-service hospital with an emergency room, St.Jude Regional Medical Center. The Fullerton Police Department provides law enforcement for the city, while the California State University Police Department provides services around the Cal State Fullerton campus.

Allegations of police misconduct
In 2011, a major controversy arose in the city over misconduct by the Fullerton Police, involving sexual assault by an officer against women he arrested and the killing of a mentally ill homeless man by police. This has led to the indictment of two officers and a recall campaign against McKinley, Bankhead, and Jones.  Officer Manuel Ramos, 37, was charged with second-degree murder and involuntary manslaughter, and Corporal Jay Patrick Cicinelli, 39, was charged with involuntary manslaughter and felony use of excessive force with regards to the death of Kelly Thomas. They pleaded not guilty.  On July 5, 2012, (one year after the beating death), the father of Kelly Thomas filed a lawsuit against the city and six officers, two of whom are facing criminal charges.  The lawsuit also names former police chiefs Patrick McKinley and Michael Sellers.  The suit alleges the violation of Kelly Thomas' federal and state civil rights; assault and battery; negligence and supervisor liability among others as causes of action.  It seeks unspecified damages.  Thomas' mother, Cathy, who is divorced from Ron Thomas, has already received a $1-million settlement from the city.  On July 3, 2012, Officer Ramos's employment was terminated. Thomas' father eventually received a 5 million dollar settlement from the City of Fullerton. Both Ramos and Cicinelli were found not guilty of any criminal charges. Both were terminated by Fullerton.

Education

Public schools
The city of Fullerton is served by three elementary and junior high school districts, two unified school districts, and one high school exclusive school district:

La Habra City School District
Buena Park School District
Fullerton School District
Brea Olinda Unified School District
Placentia-Yorba Linda Unified School District
Fullerton Joint Union High School District

Fullerton has four public high schools within the city limits, all part of the Fullerton Joint Union High School District:
Sunny Hills High School.
Fullerton Union High School. The oldest high school in Orange County, it is the home of historic Plummer Auditorium and the Academy of the Arts magnet program.
Troy High School (which includes Troy Tech, a public magnet program).
La Vista High School and La Sierra High School (continuation schools, adjacent to Troy)

Other public schooling in Fullerton is provided by the Fullerton School District. There are four public junior high schools, enrolling grades 7-8: Ladera Vista, Nicolas, Parks, and D. Russell Parks Junior High School. Fullerton has only two public elementary K-8 schools: Beechwood and Robert C. Fisler. Fullerton has fifteen public elementary schools enrolling grades K-6: Acacia, Commonwealth, Fern Drive, Golden Hill, Hermosa Drive, Laguna Road, Maple, Orangethorpe, Pacific Drive, Raymond, Richman, Rolling Hills, Sunset Lane, Valencia Park, and Woodcrest.

Private schools
Fullerton's Catholic schools are affiliated with the Roman Catholic Diocese of Orange. They include: Annunciation Catholic School, Saint Justin School, Saint Juliana School, and Rosary Academy.

Other private schools include the Arborland Montessori School, the IvyCrest Montessori School, Eastside Christian School, West Fullerton Christian School, and Berkeley School.

Postsecondary institutions
California State University, Fullerton, commonly known as Cal State Fullerton or CSUF, was first established in 1957 as Orange County State College. The twelfth member of the California State University system, it is currently composed of eight colleges, a community extended education program and several institutions and centers. As of 2019, 39,868 students were enrolled in 55 undergraduate and 55 graduate degree programs (including doctorate in education and doctor in nursing practice programs), making it the largest university in the California State University system and the second largest university in the state of California in terms of enrollment.
Fullerton College is a two-year community college, the oldest in continuous operation in California. Part of the North Orange County Community College District, it is situated on a 63-acre (255,000 m2) campus adjacent to Fullerton Union High School on Chapman Avenue and had 25,051 students enrolled as of 2019. The college offers 90 majors leading to A.A. or A.S. degrees in academic and vocational subjects, 68 programs leading to vocational certificates, and transfer programs specializing in preparing students to transfer into the California State University and University of California systems.
Hope International University is a private Christian university
Marshall B. Ketchum University is a health sciences university.

Culture

Fullerton is home to a vibrant music scene. In the early 1990s, downtown featured several venues that featured bands such as Room to Roam and Trip the Spring. 
It was a center for the Orange County hardcore punk music scene, producing acts such as The Adolescents, Agent Orange, Social Distortion, D.I., the "fathers of hardcore punk" The Middle Class, Gwen Stefani, lead vocalist of the alternative rock group No Doubt, was a student at CSUF and the group performed there regularly. Other popular groups and musicians from the area include Lit, 80s synthpop acts Berlin and Stacey Q, and Mike Ness. The popular singer-songwriter Jackson Browne attended Sunny Hills High School in the city. Singer-songwriter Tim Buckley also attended Fullerton College and dropped out after only a few weeks to focus on his music career. Fullerton is also home to one of the signature cities in the Make Music Day Alliance. Make Music Day is a global annual music celebration occurring on the summer solstice (June 21) each year in more than 1,000 cities in 120 countries across the globe. Starting in 2015, The Day of Music Fullerton began as a grass roots initiative by a team of volunteers to create a unique and free music festival in alliance with the internationally renowned Fête de la Musique. Each year on June 21 Fullerton comes alive from morning to night with musicians of all ages and musical persuasions performing in musical venues, shops, bars, restaurants, plazas, churches, parks and parking lots. From high school bands to established musicians/bands, Day of Music Fullerton is open to anyone who wants to perform and enjoyed by everyone who wants to attend for free. Since its inception, Day of Music Fullerton has grown into a popular and critical success, hosting over 150 performances in more than 40 venues around the city, including the Museum Plaza, Historic Fox Theatre, Hillcrest Park, Villa del Sol, and The Muckenthaler Cultural Center, among others.

 
Contributing greatly to Fullerton's musical heritage was the Fender musical instrument company, whose products such as the Stratocaster and Telecaster electric guitars, Precision Bass bass guitar, and Twin Reverb guitar amplifier revolutionized the music business and contributed greatly to the development of rock and roll. Leo Fender sold the company to CBS in 1965; production continued in the Fullerton plant until 1985, when the company was sold to a group of private investors. In 1980, Leo Fender and his original partner George Fullerton (relation to the Fullerton founder of the same name unknown) reunited and started a new company, G&L (George and Leo) Guitars, which are built in what had been Leo Fender's CLF Research factory in Fullerton.

The Muckenthaler Cultural Center on Malvern Avenue near Euclid Avenue houses art galleries and a theater group. The former estate of the Muckenthaler family, it was donated to the city by Harold Muckenthaler in 1965. Fullerton Friends of Music, the oldest chamber music society in Orange County, perform five concerts a year at Sunny Hills Performing Arts Center, a notable classical concert venue in the county.

Fullerton is home to the Fullerton Public Library. The Main Library is located on Commonwealth Avenue in Downtown Fullerton and adjacent to the City Hall. Formerly there was a branch library, called the Hunt Branch on Basque Avenue. The Hunt Branch was closed in 2013

There are several storefront theaters, including the Maverick Theater and Stages Theater. The Maverick Theatre is the host for the "World Famous Skipper Stand Up Show."  Held six times a year, The Skipper Stand Up Show has, since 2006, showcased former and current skippers from Disneyland's famous attraction, the Jungle Cruise.

Fullerton was also home to the Golden Baseball League's Orange County Flyers (formerly known as the Fullerton Flyers), which disbanded in 2012. The team's home was Goodwin Field, home to the Cal State Fullerton Titans.

Media
From 1921 to 1984, Fullerton had the largest independent daily newspaper in Orange County, The Fullerton Daily News Tribune. The Fullerton Daily News Tribune circulated 6 days a week, Monday thru Saturday, in all of Fullerton, Brea, Placentia, La Habra, Buena Park, Yorba Linda, and a northern section of Anaheim. At one point in the 1970s The Fullerton News Tribune reached a peak circulation of 30,000 daily subscribers. Formerly owned, for 30 years, by former Scripps newspaper executive Edgar F. Elfstrom, The Fullerton News Tribune was bought by Scripps Howard Newspapers in 1975. In 1984 the Orange County Register bought the Fullerton News Tribune and converted the daily newspaper to a once-weekly free distribution newspaper.

Fullerton is also one of the few Southern California municipalities to be served by an independent newspaper, the Fullerton Observer. The Fullerton Observer Community Newspaper is an all-volunteer 40-year-old paper that is printed twice a month. It was founded in the late 1970s by Ralph Kennedy, a fair housing and civil rights activist who advocated saving Coyote Hills as an open space. In 2010, the city of Fullerton and the Orange County Register came out in court against the then 32-year-old Fullerton Observer in its request to adjudicate the paper. In response to the city of Fullerton and the Orange County Register's high-powered lawyers coming out against the newspaper, the not-for-profit Fullerton Observer dropped its court case to be adjudicated a newspaper.

Transportation

Rail

Fullerton was founded as a railroad town and is still bisected by the BNSF Railway.

The Fullerton Transportation Center is home to train station serving Metrolink and Amtrak and a major north Orange County bus terminal for the Orange County Transportation Authority. The center is located at Harbor Blvd and Santa Fe Avenue. The bus terminal is located north of Santa Fe Avenue and serves routes 26, 43, 47, 143, 543. The Fullerton Train Station is located south of Santa Fe Avenue.

The Southern California Metrolink commuter rail system serves the city of Fullerton from the Orange County Line (Union Station, Los Angeles to Oceanside, California) and the 91/Perris Valley Line (Union Station, Los Angeles to Perris Valley in Riverside County). Travel time on Metrolink or Amtrak from Fullerton to Los Angeles is approximately 45 minutes. The city is served by two Amtrak lines. The Southwest Chief (running between Chicago and Los Angeles) and the Pacific Surfliner (running between San Diego and San Luis Obispo with major stops at Los Angeles and Santa Barbara).

In addition to the Fullerton Transportation Center, the Orange County Transportation Authority has a park-and-ride transportation hub in Fullerton located on Orangethorpe Avenue at Magnolia Avenue which makes connections to OCTA routes 25, 26, 30, 33, 35, 83, and 529 and Los Angeles Metro 460 (Downtown Los Angeles).

Roads

Fullerton is crossed by five state-maintained highways (all maintained by Caltrans' 12th district), three of which are freeways. State Route 91, the Riverside Freeway, runs east-to-west down the length of the city south of Orangethorpe Avenue. It intersects with Interstate 5, the Santa Ana Freeway, in the west near Magnolia Avenue and with State Route 57, the Orange Freeway, in the east near State College Boulevard. Short portions of State Route 39 (Beach Boulevard) and State Route 90 (Imperial Highway), also run through western and northern portions of the city, respectively.

The main road in Fullerton is Harbor Boulevard (served by OCTA route 43/143/543), a 23-mile road running from Costa Mesa to Rowland Heights. Fullerton is composed of many main arterials. Other main south-to-north arterials include Magnolia Street, Brookhurst Street, Lemon Street, Placentia Avenue, Gilbert Street, Raymond Avenue, State College Boulevard (served by OCTA route 57), Brea Boulevard (served by OCTA route 143), Euclid Street (served by OCTA route 37). Rosecrans Avenue, Bastanchury Road (not served by OCTA), Chapman and Malvern Avenues (served by OCTA route 123), Commonwealth Avenue (served by OCTA route 26) and Orangethorpe Avenue (served by OCTA route 30) are the main west-to-east arterials. Yorba Linda Boulevard (served by OCTA route 26) runs along the east end of the city. Minor arterials include Nutwood Avenue, Associated Road, Highland Avenue, Berkeley Avenue, Parks Road/Castlewood Drive, Kimberly Avenue, Acacia Avenue, Valencia Drive, and Dale Street.

Airport
Fullerton Municipal Airport, the only general aviation airport remaining in Orange County, located in the southwest of the city, is the last remnant of the Hughes Company in the area, which was prominent in the aerospace industry up until the 1970s. From the early 1970s through the early 1980s the airport was served by Golden West Airlines, one of the larger commuter airlines of the period. The nearest airport with scheduled service is John Wayne Airport (SNA) in Santa Ana.

Sister cities
 Fukui, Japan
 Morelia, Mexico (the city of Fullerton has a street named Morelia Avenue, named after their sister city)
 Yongin, South Korea

See also
List of people from Fullerton, California

References

External links

 
 
 Downtown Fullerton
 Fullerton Chamber of Commerce
 Fullerton Heritage
 Fullerton Observer
 Fullerton Transportation Center
 Fullerton Community Center
 Fullerton Library

 
1904 establishments in California
Cities in Orange County, California
Incorporated cities and towns in California
Populated places established in 1904